The Rio Campo Natural Reserve is found in Equatorial Guinea. It was established in 2000. This site is 330 km.

It is one of the representative ecosystems and globally significant biodiversity, representing an important example of coastal forest.

It is located at an altitude of 125 meters.

References

Protected areas of Equatorial Guinea
Protected areas established in 2000